500 (five hundred) is the natural number following 499 and preceding 501.

Mathematical properties 

500 = 22 × 53. It is an Achilles number and an Harshad number, meaning it is divisible by the sum of its digits. It is the number of planar partitions of 10.

Other fields 
Five hundred is also

the number that many NASCAR races often use at the end of their race names (e.g., Daytona 500), to denote the length of the race (in miles, kilometers or laps).
the longest advertised distance (in miles) of the IndyCar Series and its premier race, the Indianapolis 500.

Slang names
 Monkey (UK slang for £500; USA slang for $500)

Integers from 501 to 599

500s

501

501 = 3 × 167. It is:
 the sum of the first 18 primes (a term of the sequence ).
 palindromic in bases 9 (6169) and 20 (15120).

502
 502 = 2 × 251
 vertically symmetric number

503
503 is:
 a prime number.
 a safe prime.
 the sum of three consecutive primes (163 + 167 + 173).
 the sum of the cubes of the first four primes.
 a Chen prime
 an Eisenstein prime with no imaginary part.
 an index of a prime Lucas number.
 an isolated prime

504
504 = 23 × 32 × 7. It is:
 a tribonacci number.
 a semi-meandric number.
 a refactorable number.
 a Harshad number.
 is prime
the group order of the fourth smallest non-cyclic simple group A1(8) = 2G2(3)′.
the number of symmetries of the simple group PSL(2,8) that is the automorphism group of the Macbeath surface.

505
 505 = 5 × 101
 model number of Levi's jeans, model number of 
 This number is the magic constant of n×n normal magic square and n-queens problem for n = 10.

506
506 = 2 × 11 × 23. It is:
 a sphenic number.
 a square pyramidal number.
 a pronic number.
 a Harshad number.

507
 507 = 3 × 132 = 232 - 23 + 1, which makes it a central polygonal number
 The age Ming had before dying.

508
 508 = 22 × 127, sum of four consecutive primes (113 + 127 + 131 + 137), number of graphical forest partitions of 30, since 508 = 222 + 22 + 2 it is the maximum number of regions into which 23 intersecting circles divide the plane.

509
509 is:
 a prime number.
 a Sophie Germain prime, smallest Sophie Germain prime to start a 4-term Cunningham chain of the first kind {509, 1019, 2039, 4079}.
 a Chen prime.
 an Eisenstein prime with no imaginary part.
 a highly cototient number
 a prime index prime.

510s

510
510 = 2 × 3 × 5 × 17. It is:
 the sum of eight consecutive primes (47 + 53 + 59 + 61 + 67 + 71 + 73 + 79).
 the sum of ten consecutive primes (31 + 37 + 41 + 43 + 47 + 53 + 59 + 61 + 67 + 71).
 the sum of twelve consecutive primes (19 + 23 + 29 + 31 + 37 + 41 + 43 + 47 + 53 + 59 + 61 + 67).
 a nontotient.
 a sparsely totient number.
 a Harshad number.
 the number of nonempty proper subsets of an 9-element set.

511

511 = 7 × 73. It is:
 a Harshad number.
 a palindromic number and a repdigit in bases 2 (1111111112) and 8 (7778)
5-1-1, a roadway status and transit information hotline in many metropolitan areas of the United States.

512

512 = 83 = 29. It is:
 a power of two.
 a cube of 8.
 a Leyland number.
 a Dudeney number.
 a Harshad number.
 palindromic in bases 7 (13317) and 15 (24215).
 a vertically symmetric number .

513
513 = 33 × 19. It is:
 Leyland number of the second kind
 palindromic in bases 2 (10000000012) and 8 (10018)
 a Harshad number
 Area code of Cincinnati, Ohio

514
514 = 2 × 257, it is:
 a centered triangular number.
 a nontotient
 a palindrome in bases 4 (200024), 16 (20216), and 19 (18119)
 an Area Code for Montreal Canada

515
515 = 5 × 103, it is:
 the sum of nine consecutive primes (41 + 43 + 47 + 53 + 59 + 61 + 67 + 71 + 73).
 the number of complete compositions of 11.

516
516 = 22 × 3 × 43, it is:
 nontotient.
 untouchable number.
 refactorable number.
 a Harshad number.

517
517 = 11 × 47, it is:
 the sum of five consecutive primes (97 + 101 + 103 + 107 + 109).
 a Smith number.

518
518 = 2 × 7 × 37, it is:
 = 51 + 12 + 83 (a property shared with 175 and 598).
 a sphenic number.
 a nontotient.
 an untouchable number.
 palindromic and a repdigit in bases 6 (22226) and 36 (EE36).
 a Harshad number.

519
519 = 3 × 173, it is:
 the sum of three consecutive primes (167 + 173 + 179)
 palindromic in bases 9 (6369) and 12 (37312)
 a D-number.

520s

520
520 = 23 × 5 × 13. It is:
 an untouchable number.
 an idoneal number
 a palindromic number in base 14 (29214).

521
521 is:
 a Lucas prime.
 A Mersenne exponent, i.e. 2521−1 is prime.
 The largest known such exponent that is the lesser of twin primes
 a Chen prime.
 an Eisenstein prime with no imaginary part.
 palindromic in bases 11 (43411) and 20 (16120).
4521 - 3521 is prime

522
522 = 2 × 32 × 29. It is:
 the sum of six consecutive primes (73 + 79 + 83 + 89 + 97 + 101).
 a repdigit in bases 28 (II28) and 57 (9957).
 a Harshad number.
 number of series-parallel networks with 8 unlabeled edges.

523
523 is:
 a prime number.
 the sum of seven consecutive primes (61 + 67 + 71 + 73 + 79 + 83 + 89).
 palindromic in bases 13 (31313) and 18 (1B118).
 a prime with a prime number of prime digits

524
524 = 22 × 131
 number of partitions of 44 into powers of 2

525
525 = 3 × 52 × 7. It is:
 palindromic in base 10 (52510).
 the number of scan lines in the NTSC television standard.
 a self number.

526
526 = 2 × 263, centered pentagonal number, nontotient, Smith number

527
527 = 17 × 31. it is:
 palindromic in base 15 (25215)
 number of diagonals in a 34-gon
 also, the section of the US Tax Code regulating soft money political campaigning (see 527 groups)

528
528 = 24 × 3 × 11. It is:
 a triangular number.
 palindromic in bases 9 (6469) and 17 (1E117).

529
529 = 232. It is:
 a centered octagonal number.
 a lazy caterer number .
 also Section 529 of the IRS tax code organizes 529 plans to encourage saving for higher education.

530s

530
530 = 2 × 5 × 53. It is:
 a sphenic number.
 a nontotient.
 the sum of totient function for first 41 integers.
 an untouchable number.
 the sum of the first three perfect numbers.
 palindromic in bases 4 (201024), 16 (21216), and 23 (10123).
 a US telephone area code that covers much of Northern California.

531
531 = 32 × 59. It is:
 palindromic in base 12 (38312).
 a Harshad number.
 number of symmetric matrices with nonnegative integer entries and without zero rows or columns such that sum of all entries is equal to 6

532
532 = 22 × 7 × 19. It is:
 a pentagonal number.
 a nontotient.
 palindromic and a repdigit in bases 11 (44411), 27 (JJ27), and 37 (EE37).
 admirable number.

533
533 = 13 × 41. It is:
 the sum of three consecutive primes (173 + 179 + 181).
 the sum of five consecutive primes (101 + 103 + 107 + 109 + 113).
 palindromic in base 19 (19119).
 generalized octagonal number.

534
534 = 2 × 3 × 89. It is:
 a sphenic number.
 the sum of four consecutive primes (127 + 131 + 137 + 139).
 a nontotient.
 palindromic in bases 5 (41145) and 14 (2A214).
 an admirable number.

 is prime

535
535 = 5 × 107. It is:
 a Smith number.

535 is used as an abbreviation for May 35, which is used in China instead of June 4 to evade censorship by the Chinese government of references on the Internet to the Tiananmen Square protests of 1989.

536
536 = 23 × 67. It is:
 the number of ways to arrange the pieces of the ostomachion into a square, not counting rotation or reflection.
 the number of 1's in all partitions of 23 into odd parts
 a refactorable number.
 the lowest happy number beginning with the digit 5.

537
537 = 3 × 179, Mertens function (537) = 0, Blum integer, D-number

538
538 = 2 × 269. It is:
 an open meandric number.
 a nontotient.
 the total number of votes in the United States Electoral College.
 the website FiveThirtyEight.
 Radio 538, a Dutch commercial radio station

539
539 = 72 × 11

 is prime

540s

540
540 = 22 × 33 × 5. It is:
 an untouchable number.
 a heptagonal number.
 a decagonal number.
 a repdigit in bases 26 (KK26), 29 (II29), 35 (FF35), 44 (CC44), 53 (AA53), and 59 (9959).
 a Harshad number.
 the number of doors to Valhalla according to the Prose Edda.
 the number of floors in Thor's hall, known as Bilskirnir, according to the Prose Edda.
 the sum of a twin prime (269 + 271)

541
541 is:
 the 100th prime.
 a lucky prime.
 a Chen prime.
 the 10th star number.
 palindromic in bases 18 (1C118) and 20 (17120).
 an Ordered Bell number.
Mertens function(541) = 0. 4541 - 3541 is prime.

542
542 = 2 × 271. It is:
 a nontotient.
 the sum of totient function for the first 42 integers.

543
543 = 3 × 181; palindromic in bases 11 (45411) and 12 (39312), D-number.

 is prime

544
544 = 25 × 17. Take a grid of 2 times 5 points. There are 14 points on the perimeter. Join every pair of the perimeter points by a line segment. The lines do not extend outside the grid. 544 is the number of regions formed by these lines.

545
545 = 5 × 109. It is:
 a centered square number.
 palindromic in bases 10 (54510) and 17 (1F117).

546
546 = 2 × 3 × 7 × 13. It is:
 the sum of eight consecutive primes (53 + 59 + 61 + 67 + 71 + 73 + 79 + 83).
 palindromic in bases 4 (202024), 9 (6669), and 16 (22216).
 a repdigit in bases 9 and 16.
 546! − 1 is prime.

547
547 is:
 a prime number.
 a cuban prime.
 a centered hexagonal number.
 a centered heptagonal number.
 a prime index prime.

548
548 = 22 × 137. It is:
 a nontotient.
 the default port for the Apple Filing Protocol.
Also, every positive integer is the sum of at most 548 ninth powers;

549
549 = 32 × 61, it is:
 a repdigit in bases 13 (33313) and 60 (9960).
 φ(549) = φ(σ(549)).

550s

550
550 = 2 × 52 × 11. It is:
 a pentagonal pyramidal number.
 a primitive abundant number.
 a nontotient.
 a repdigit in bases 24 (MM24), 49 (BB49), and 54 (AA54).
 a Harshad number.
 the SMTP status code meaning the requested action was not taken because the mailbox is unavailable

551
551 = 19 × 29. It is:
 It is the number of mathematical trees on 12 unlabeled nodes. 
 the sum of three consecutive primes (179 + 181 + 191).
 palindromic in base 22 (13122).
 the SMTP status code meaning user is not local

552
552 = 23 × 3 × 23. It is:
 the sum of six consecutive primes (79 + 83 + 89 + 97 + 101 + 103).
 the sum of ten consecutive primes (37 + 41 + 43 + 47 + 53 + 59 + 61 + 67 + 71 + 73).
 a pronic number.
 an untouchable number.
 palindromic in base 19 (1A119).
 a Harshad number.
 the SMTP status code meaning requested action aborted because the mailbox is full.

553
553 = 7 × 79. It is:
 the sum of nine consecutive primes (43 + 47 + 53 + 59 + 61 + 67 + 71 + 73 + 79).
 central polygonal number.
 the SMTP status code meaning requested action aborted because of faulty mailbox name.

554
554 = 2 × 277. It is:
 a nontotient.
 a 2-Knödel number
 the SMTP status code meaning transaction failed.
Mertens function(554) = 6, a record high that stands until 586.

555

555 = 3 × 5 × 37 is:
 a sphenic number.
 palindromic in bases 9 (6769), 10 (55510), and 12 (3A312).
 a repdigit in bases 10 and 36.
 a Harshad number.
 φ(555) = φ(σ(555)).

556
556 = 22 × 139. It is:
 the sum of four consecutive primes (131 + 137 + 139 + 149).
 an untouchable number, because it is never the sum of the proper divisors of any integer.
 a happy number.

557
557 is:
 a prime number.
 a Chen prime.
 an Eisenstein prime with no imaginary part.
 the number of parallelogram polyominoes with 9 cells.

558
558 = 2 × 32 × 31. It is:
 a nontotient.
 a repdigit in bases 30 (II30) and 61 (9961).
 a Harshad number.
 The sum of the largest prime factors of the first 558 is itself divisible by 558 (the previous such number is 62, the next is 993).
 in the title of the Star Trek: Deep Space Nine episode "The Siege of AR-558"

559
559 = 13 × 43. It is:
 the sum of five consecutive primes (103 + 107 + 109 + 113 + 127).
 the sum of seven consecutive primes (67 + 71 + 73 + 79 + 83 + 89 + 97).
 a nonagonal number.
 a centered cube number.
 palindromic in base 18 (1D118).

560s

560
560 = 24 × 5 × 7. It is:
 a tetrahedral number.
 a refactorable number.
 palindromic in bases 3 (2022023) and 6 (23326).
 the number of diagonals in a 35-gon

561
561 = 3 × 11 × 17. It is:
 a sphenic number.
 a triangular number.
 a hexagonal number.
 palindromic in bases 2 (10001100012) and 20 (18120).
 the first Carmichael number

562
562 = 2 × 281. It is:
 a Smith number.
 an untouchable number.
 the sum of twelve consecutive primes (23 + 29 + 31 + 37 + 41 + 43 + 47 + 53 + 59 + 61 + 67 + 71).
 palindromic in bases 4 (203024), 13 (34313), 14 (2C214), 16 (23216), and 17 (1G117).
 a lazy caterer number .
 the number of Native American (including Alaskan) Nations, or "Tribes," recognized by the USA government.
56264 + 1 is prime

563
563 is:
 a prime number.
 a safe prime.
 the largest known Wilson prime.
 a Chen prime.
 an Eisenstein prime with no imaginary part.
 a balanced prime.
 a strictly non-palindromic number.
 a sexy prime.
 a happy prime.
 a prime index prime.
 5563 - 4563 is prime.

564
564 = 22 × 3 × 47. It is:
 the sum of a twin prime (281 + 283).
 a refactorable number.
 palindromic in bases 5 (42245) and 9 (6869).
 number of primes <= 212.

565
565 = 5 × 113. It is:
 the sum of three consecutive primes (181 + 191 + 193).
 a member of the Mian–Chowla sequence.
 a happy number.
 palindromic in bases 10 (56510) and 11 (47411).

566
566 = 2 × 283. It is:
 nontotient.
 a happy number.
 a 2-Knödel number.

567
567 = 34 × 7. It is:
 palindromic in base 12 (3B312).
 is prime

568
568 = 23 × 71. It is:
 the sum of the first nineteen primes (a term of the sequence ).
 a refactorable number.
 palindromic in bases 7 (14417) and 21 (16121).
 the smallest number whose seventh power is the sum of 7 seventh powers.
 the room number booked by Benjamin Braddock in the 1967 film The Graduate.
 the number of millilitres in an imperial pint.
 the name of the Student Union bar at Imperial College London

569
569 is:
 a prime number.
 a Chen prime.
 an Eisenstein prime with no imaginary part.
 a strictly non-palindromic number.

570s

570
570 = 2 × 3 × 5 × 19. It is:
 a triangular matchstick number
 a balanced number

571
571 is:
 a prime number.
 a Chen prime.
 a centered triangular number.

572
572 = 22 × 11 × 13. It is:
 a primitive abundant number.
 a nontotient.
 palindromic in bases 3 (2100123) and 15 (28215).

573
573 = 3 × 191. It is:
 a Blum integer
 known as the Konami number, since "ko-na-mi" is associated with 573 in the Japanese wordplay Goroawase 
 the model number of

574
574 = 2 × 7 × 41. It is:
 a sphenic number.
 a nontotient.
 palindromic in base 9 (7079).
 number of partitions of 27 that do not contain 1 as a part.

575
575 = 52 × 23. It is:
 palindromic in bases 10 (57510) and 13 (35313).
 a centered octahedral number.
And the sum of the squares of the first 575 primes is divisible by 575.

576
576 = 26 × 32 = 242. It is:
 the sum of four consecutive primes (137 + 139 + 149 + 151).
 a highly totient number.
 a Smith number.
 an untouchable number.
 palindromic in bases 11 (48411), 14 (2D214), and 23 (12123).
 a Harshad number.
 four-dozen sets of a dozen, which makes it 4 gross.
 a cake number.
 the number of parts in all compositions of 8.

577
577 is:
 a prime number.
 a Proth prime.
 a Chen prime.
 palindromic in bases 18 (1E118) and 24 (10124).
 the number of seats in National Assembly (France).

578
578 = 2 × 172. It is:
 a nontotient.
 palindromic in base 16 (24216).
 area of a square with diagonal 34

579
579 = 3 × 193; it is a ménage number, and a semiprime.

580s

580
580 = 22 × 5 × 29. It is:
 the sum of six consecutive primes (83 + 89 + 97 + 101 + 103 + 107).
 palindromic in bases 12 (40412) and 17 (20217).

581
581 = 7 × 83. It is:
 the sum of three consecutive primes (191 + 193 + 197).
 a Blum integer

582
582 = 2 × 3 × 97. It is:
 a sphenic number.
 the sum of eight consecutive primes (59 + 61 + 67 + 71 + 73 + 79 + 83 + 89).
 a nontotient.
 a vertically symmetric number .
 an admirable number.

583
583 = 11 × 53. It is:
 palindromic in base 9 (7179).
 number of compositions of 11 whose run-lengths are either weakly increasing or weakly decreasing

584
584 = 23 × 73. It is:
 an untouchable number.
 the sum of totient function for first 43 integers.
 a refactorable number.

585
585 = 32 × 5 × 13. It is:
 palindromic in bases 2 (10010010012), 8 (11118), and 10 (58510).
 a repdigit in bases 8, 38, 44, and 64.
 the sum of powers of 8 from 0 to 3.

When counting in binary with fingers, expressing 585 as 1001001001, results in the isolation of the index and little fingers of each hand, "throwing up the horns".

586

586 = 2 × 293.
 Mertens function(586) = 7 a record high that stands until 1357.
 2-Knödel number.
 it is the number of several popular personal computer processors (such as the Intel Pentium).

587
587 is:
 a prime number.
 safe prime.
 a Chen prime.
 an Eisenstein prime with no imaginary part.
 the sum of five consecutive primes (107 + 109 + 113 + 127 + 131).
 palindromic in bases 11 (49411) and 15 (29215).
 the outgoing port for email message submission.
 a prime index prime.

588
588 = 22 × 3 × 72. It is:
 a Smith number.
 palindromic in base 13 (36313).
 a Harshad number.

589
589 = 19 × 31. It is:
 the sum of three consecutive primes (193 + 197 + 199).
 palindromic in base 21 (17121).
 a centered tetrahedral number.

590s

590
590 = 2 × 5 × 59. It is:
 a sphenic number.
 a pentagonal number.
 a nontotient.
  palindromic in base 19 (1C119).

591
591 = 3 × 197, D-number

592
592 = 24 × 37. It is:
 palindromic in bases 9 (7279) and 12 (41412).
 a Harshad number.

59264 + 1 is prime

593
593 is:
 a prime number.
 a Sophie Germain prime.
 the sum of seven consecutive primes (71 + 73 + 79 + 83 + 89 + 97 + 101).
 the sum of nine consecutive primes (47 + 53 + 59 + 61 + 67 + 71 + 73 + 79 + 83).
 an Eisenstein prime with no imaginary part.
 a balanced prime.
 a Leyland prime.
 a member of the Mian–Chowla sequence.
 strictly non-palindromic prime.

594
594 = 2 ×  33 × 11. It is:
 the sum of ten consecutive primes (41 + 43 + 47 + 53 + 59 + 61 + 67 + 71 + 73 + 79).
 a nontotient.
 palindromic in bases 5 (43345) and 16 (25216).
 a Harshad number.
 the number of diagonals in a 36-gon.
 a balanced number.

595
595 = 5 × 7 × 17. It is:
 a sphenic number.
 a triangular number.
 centered nonagonal number.
 palindromic in bases 10 (59510) and 18 (1F118).

596
596 = 22 × 149. It is:
 the sum of four consecutive primes (139 + 149 + 151 + 157).
 a nontotient.
 a lazy caterer number .

597
597 = 3 × 199. It is:
 a Blum integer

598
598 = 2 × 13 × 23 = 51 + 92 + 83. It is:
 a sphenic number.
 palindromic in bases 4 (211124) and 11 (4A411).
 number of non-alternating permutations of {1...6}.

599
599 is:
 a prime number.
 a Chen prime.
 an Eisenstein prime with no imaginary part.
 a prime index prime.

4599 - 3599 is prime.

References

Integers